Chemistry World is a monthly chemistry news magazine published by the Royal Society of Chemistry. The magazine addresses current events in world of chemistry including research, international business news and government policy as it affects the chemical science community, plus the best product applications.  It features regular columns by Philip Ball, Derek Lowe, Andrea Sella, Raychelle Burks, Alice Motion and Vanessa Seifert.  The magazine is sent to all members of the Royal Society of Chemistry and is included in the cost of membership. In August 2016, the magazine began offering a "soft" paywall option, where a limited amount of content is made available free to all unregistered readers.

According to the Journal Citation Reports, the journal has a 2011 impact factor of 0.159, ranking it 146th out of 154 journals in the category "Chemistry, Multidisciplinary".

History
In 1965 two British chemistry institutions, the Chemical Society and the Royal Institute of Chemistry agreed to merge their primary publications Proceedings of the Chemical Society and the Journal of the Royal Institute of Chemistry. This was a first step to merger of the institutions.  The new journal was entitled Chemistry in Britain.

In January 2004 it was given "a new title, to acknowledge the international nature of the subject".

References

External links
 

2004 establishments in the United Kingdom
Magazines established in 2004
Magazines published in London
Monthly magazines published in the United Kingdom
Professional and trade magazines
Royal Society of Chemistry academic journals
Science and technology magazines published in the United Kingdom